Sergio Zardini (22 November 1931 – 22 February 1966) was an Italian bobsledder who competed from the late 1950s to the mid-1960s. He won the silver medal in the two-man event at the 1964 Winter Olympics in Innsbruck. He was born in Turin.

Zardini also won ten medals at the FIBT World Championships with one gold (Four-man: 1963), six silvers (Two-man: 1958, 1959, 1962, 1963; Four-man: 1959, 1962), and three bronzes (Two-man: 1960, 1961; Four-man: 1958).

Following the 1964 games, Zardini emigrated to Canada where he competed. He was killed during a competition two years later at the bobsleigh track in Lake Placid, New York when the Canadian four-man sled hit the superstructure of the track at Turns 13 and 14, known as the "Zig-Zag Curves", crushing his head against the structure.

References
 Bobsleigh two-man Olympic medalists 1932-56 and since 1964
 Bobsleigh two-man world championship medalists since 1931
 Bobsleigh four-man world championship medalists since 1930
 DatabaseOlympics.com profile
 Image showing Zardini's fatal crash
 "The Deadly Zig-Zag". TIME. March 4, 1966 - Accessed August 12, 2007.
 

1931 births
1966 deaths
Sportspeople from Turin
Canadian male bobsledders
Italian male bobsledders
Bobsledders at the 1964 Winter Olympics
Olympic bobsledders of Italy
Olympic silver medalists for Italy
Bobsledders who died while racing
Sports deaths in New York (state)
Olympic medalists in bobsleigh
Medalists at the 1964 Winter Olympics
Italian emigrants to Canada